The South Caribbean Coast Autonomous Regional Council is the devolved legislature of the South Caribbean Coast Autonomous Region. It has the power to legislate on a wide variety of economic, social, and cultural issues not reserved to the central government. The council has the same power as the North Caribbean Coast Autonomous Regional Council.

History 
Autonomy is framed in the recognition of the historical rights of indigenous peoples, Afro-descendants and ethnic communities of the Caribbean Coast that were legally constituted in 1987 in the statutes of Law 28 of Autonomy.

As of the approval of Law 28 in October 1987, the Autonomous Regions began a process of creation, strengthening and development of the autonomous institutions.

Its first advances occurred with the formation of the Autonomous Governments in both Regions, through five electoral processes (1990, 1994, 1998, 2002, 2006, 2010, 2014 and 2019). In this process of regional elections, three representatives are elected from fifteen different electoral districts of each of the regions, for a total of 45 Councilors, Councilors and two Regional Deputies and Deputies in each Autonomous Region.

The Communities of the Caribbean Coast are an indissoluble part of the unitary and indivisible State of Nicaragua and its inhabitants enjoy all the rights and duties that correspond to them as Nicaraguans in accordance with the Political Constitution of the Republic.

The Autonomous Regional Councils of the Caribbean Coast represent the fundamental bodies of the Autonomous institutional framework and are political and administrative structures created to guarantee multiethnic representation since the first autonomous regional elections were held in May 1990.

The legal order of the Autonomy regime of the Caribbean Coast is based on the Political Constitution, the Statute of Autonomy and its Regulations, the Law of Special Regime of Indigenous Communal Lands, as well as other secondary legislation approved in the last ten years. The Regional Councils are made up of forty-five members belonging to the different ethnic groups present in the Regions, and are elected by universal, free and direct vote by the people.

On January 10, 2007, in Nicaragua, a new Model for the well-being of the population began; the Christian, Socialist and Solidarity Model, which puts people, families and communities at the center of public action. The fundamental objective of this Model is to carry out economic, social, and political transformations with the leading role of all Nicaraguans and especially those population groups who have historically been denied their rights, such as women, young people, girls, boys and adolescents. , the elderly, the disabled and Native and Afro-descendant peoples and ethnic communities.

Current list of Regional Deputies and Councilors

References

South Caribbean Coast Autonomous Region
Autonomous regions of Nicaragua
1990 establishments in Nicaragua
History of Nicaragua
South Caribbean Coast Autonomous Region
North Caribbean Coast Autonomous Region